"A Little Bit of Her Love" is a song co-written and recorded by American country music artist Robert Ellis Orrall.  It was released in February 1993 as the second single from the album Flying Colors.  The song reached #31 on the Billboard Hot Country Singles & Tracks chart.  The song was written by Orrall and Lonnie Wilson.

Chart performance

References

1993 singles
1993 songs
Robert Ellis Orrall songs
Songs written by Robert Ellis Orrall
Songs written by Lonnie Wilson
Song recordings produced by Josh Leo
RCA Records singles